Martha Herbert is an American physician and assistant professor of neurology at Harvard Medical School and pediatric neurologist at Massachusetts General Hospital. Herbert is also director of the TRANSCEND program at the Athinoula A. Martinos Center for Biomedical Imaging.

Education
Herbert graduated, and received her medical degree, from the Columbia University College of Physicians and Surgeons after obtaining a doctoral degree at the University of California, Santa Cruz. She trained in evolutionary biology and the development of learning processes, and performed postdoctoral work in the philosophy and history of science.

Career
Herbert began seeing patients in a psychiatry clinic in 1996; these patients suffered from a variety of psychological disabilities, including headaches, seizures, behavioral-control problems, obsessions, and tics. However, as time went on she began seeing a higher proportion of autistic children. Around the same time, she was conducting a number of neuroimaging studies on differences in the brains of autistic children, and as a result of this research, she concluded that autism is a disorder that affects the entire body, not just the brain.

Autism research
Herbert has claimed that many children with autism have biomedical problems, and that these problems exacerbate the symptoms of autism. Her research focuses on attributing the development of autism to the existence of certain predisposing genes, with her coauthors on this topic including Peter Szatmari. In addition, some of her research focuses on the possible existence of enlarged superficial white matter in the brains of people with autism, as well as developmental language disorder.

Views on environmental autism causes
More recently, Herbert published an opinion paper in 2010 which argued, among other things, that "Systemic and central nervous system pathophysiology, including oxidative stress, neuroinflammation, and mitochondrial dysfunction can be consistent with a role for environmental influence," as well as a case report in the Journal of Child Neurology, which described a patient with autistic symptoms who improved markedly after she was placed on a gluten-free, casein-free diet. 

Herbert has been a regular presenter at anti-vaccine conferences.

Herbert's view of environmental causes of autism has been ruled inadmissible by a Massachusetts Superior Court judge, who said "Dr. Herbert’s method is not generally accepted in the scientific community. Dr. Herbert’s theory of environmental triggers of autism may some day prove true. It has not yet. Her proffered testimony does not meet the standard of reliability required by the case law, and cannot be admitted in evidence at trial." 

Herbert has threatened to sue journalists for reporting her views.

The Autism Revolution
Herbert is also the author of a book, The Autism Revolution: Whole-Body Strategies for Making Life All It Can Be, published in 2012 by Ballantine Books. In the book, she recounts stories of children with autism who followed recommendations to receive unconventional autism treatments, and whose conditions improved--"sometimes dramatically so", according to Herbert. It was reviewed in the Washington Post, the Journal of Hospital Librarianship, and Kirkus Reviews.

References

Autism researchers
Columbia University Vagelos College of Physicians and Surgeons alumni
Harvard Medical School faculty
Living people
Massachusetts General Hospital faculty
Pediatric neurologists
University of California, Santa Cruz alumni
Year of birth missing (living people)